George Beattie may refer to:

 George Beattie (footballer) (1925–2012), Scottish footballer
 George Beattie (poet) (1786–1823), Scottish poet
 George Beattie (shooter) (1877–?), Canadian sport shooter

See also
George Beatty (disambiguation)